Kasafoni is a town in northeastern Sierra Leone in the mountainous area near the Guinea border.

Mining 

The area is prospective for iron ore.

References 

Populated places in Sierra Leone